David Jacovic (born 5 February 2001) is a Swiss football midfielder who plays for St. Gallen.

Club career
He was raised in the youth system of St. Gallen and began playing for their U21 squad in Swiss 1. Liga in 2017.

He made his Swiss Super League debut for St. Gallen on 21 May 2021 in a game against Servette.

International career
Born in Switzerland, Jacovic is of Serbian descent. He represented Switzerland at the 2018 UEFA European Under-17 Championship, they did not advance from the group stage.

References

External links
 
 SFL Profile

2001 births
Sportspeople from St. Gallen (city)
Living people
Swiss men's footballers
Switzerland youth international footballers
Swiss people of Serbian descent
Association football midfielders
FC St. Gallen players
Swiss 1. Liga (football) players
Swiss Super League players